Kidderpore Muslim High School is an Urdu-medium boys' school located at Kidderpore.

History
The school was established in 1952 and is affiliated to the West Bengal Board of Secondary Education for Madhyamik Pariksha, and to the West Bengal Council of Higher Secondary Education for Higher Secondary Examination.

See also
Education in India
List of schools in India
Education in West Bengal

References

External links 
 

Boys' schools in India
High schools and secondary schools in Kolkata
Educational institutions established in 1999
1999 establishments in West Bengal